Jorge Francisco Almirón Quintana (born June 19, 1971), commonly known as Jorge Almirón, is an Argentine football manager and former player who played as a defensive midfielder.

Career
On July 26, 1997, Almirón made his Liga MX debut with Atlas in a 2–1 victory over Puebla.

In the season of the Clausura 2006, he helped Querétaro pass to the Primera División of Mexico but then demoted back to the Segunda Division (now called Liga de Ascenso) in Clausura 2007. In 2008, he was named player-coach of Dorados.

As manager, Almirón guided Lanús to achieve its second league title ever and reached the 2017 Copa Libertadores finals, where they were defeated by Brazilian club Grêmio.

In November 2018, he was introduced as the new manager of San Lorenzo.

In June 2019, Almirón became the new manager of the Al-Shabab FC after the Saudi club sacked the Romanian manager Marius Șumudică.

On 26 August 2020, Almirón was appointed manager of recently promoted La Liga club Elche CF.

Managerial statistics

Titles

As player
Santiago Wanderers
 Primera B de Chile: 1995

Morelia
Mexican Primera División: Invierno 2000

Querétaro
Ascenso MX: Clausura 2006

As manager
Lanús
 Argentine Primera División: 2016
 Copa del Bicentenario: 2016
 Supercopa Argentina: 2016

References

External links
footballdatabase.com
mediotiempo.com

1971 births
Living people
Argentine footballers
Argentine expatriate footballers
Association football midfielders
Santiago Wanderers footballers
Atlético Morelia players
Dorados de Sinaloa footballers
Atlas F.C. footballers
Club León footballers
Querétaro F.C. footballers
Atlante F.C. footballers
Primera B de Chile players
Chilean Primera División players
Liga MX players
Expatriate footballers in Chile
Expatriate footballers in Mexico
Argentine football managers
Expatriate football managers in Colombia
Dorados de Sinaloa managers
Defensa y Justicia managers
C.D. Veracruz managers
Club Tijuana managers
Godoy Cruz Antonio Tomba managers
Club Atlético Independiente managers
Club Atlético Lanús managers
Atlético Nacional managers
San Lorenzo de Almagro managers
Saudi Professional League managers
Elche CF managers
Argentine expatriate football managers
Argentine expatriate sportspeople in Spain
Expatriate football managers in Spain
Sportspeople from Buenos Aires Province